Hush (also Romanized as Hūsh) is a village in Miyan Rud Rural District, Qolqol Rud District, Tuyserkan County, Hamadan Province, Iran. At the 2006 census, its population was 263, in 52 families.

References 

Populated places in Tuyserkan County